Awfully Chocolate is a bakery chain with locations throughout Asia. It is known for its all chocolate cake and other desserts. It operates 17 locations including shops, cafes, and restaurants.

History
Awfully Chocolate was founded by Lyn Lee, who quit her job as an attorney to start the business in 1998. Its first store was in Katong in Singapore. Only one type of cake was sold: a round six-inch chocolate fudge cake called the "All-Chocolate Cake". The store had an unusual minimalist design in dark brown and white, with the cakes not on display.

Awfully Chocolate received early attention for not looking like a typical cake store and its similarly minimalist-looking single product.

Its second store, at Cluny Court, was opened in 2004.

By 2007 there were 17 franchise locations in Asia, including China, Taiwan, and Hong Kong.

It later opened a cafe called Ninethirty.

Products

Cakes 
The All-Chocolate Cake was Awfully Chocolate's first product. It was sold in whole 6-inch cakes. Half a year later, the Chocolate Banana Cake was introduced, followed by the Chocolate Rum & Cherry Cake for Christmas in December 1999.

Ice Cream 
2005 marked the release of Hei Ice Cream, the company's signature dark chocolate ice cream. They were served in containers that resemble American Chinese take-out food boxes, with a Chinese character "Hei" that means dark.

Seasonal Products 
Every Christmas, Awfully Chocolate sells log cakes based on their original All-Chocolate Cake.

References

External links
Official website

Singaporean brands
Singaporean companies established in 1998
Food and drink companies established in 1998
Retail companies established in 1998
Food and drink companies of Singapore
Retail companies of Singapore
1998 establishments in Singapore